DiCenzo is a surname. Notable people with the surname include:

George DiCenzo (1940–2010), American actor and producer
Greg DiCenzo (born 1975), American baseball coach and former football, soccer, and baseball player

Surnames of Italian origin